Tweek may refer to:
 Tweek (gamer), the handle of esports player Gavin Dempsey
 Tweek Tweak, a fictional student at South Park Elementary

See also
 Tweak (disambiguation)